Butyl acetate most often refers to n-butyl acetate.  However, there are other isomers that may be considered to be butyl acetates:
Isobutyl acetate
sec-Butyl acetate
tert-Butyl acetate

Acetate esters